The Spencer–Shippee–Lillbridge House, also known as the Crossways Farm and Walnut Brook Farm, is a historic farmstead at 12 Middle Road in East Greenwich, Rhode Island.  The main house is a -story timber-frame structure, five bays wide and three bays deep, whose construction date is traditionally given as 1772.  There is, however, architectural evidence that it may be older (c. 1750).  The building has a small 19th century addition, whose purpose was to provide a staircase for hired farmhands to reach the attic, where their living space was.  The downstairs spaces have retained much of their original Georgian fabric, although a pantry space has been converted into a modern kitchen.  There are five outbuildings on the  property, including a 19th-century wagon shed and horse barn.  The house, once the centerpiece of a  farm, was held by members of the interrelated Spencer, Shippee, and Lillbridge families from its inception until 2001.

The property was listed on the National Register of Historic Places in 2011.

See also
National Register of Historic Places listings in Kent County, Rhode Island

References

Houses completed in 1772
Houses on the National Register of Historic Places in Rhode Island
Houses in Kent County, Rhode Island
Buildings and structures in East Greenwich, Rhode Island
National Register of Historic Places in Kent County, Rhode Island
1772 establishments in Rhode Island